Simon Stefani (3 January 1929 - 2 August 2000) was an Albanian politician of the communist era. Stefani was born in Përmet. He served as Chairman of the Assembly of the Republic of Albania from 25 December 1978 to 22 November 1981, as well as member of the Central Committee of the Party of Labour of Albania from 1976 to 1991. Stefani was  partly of Greek origin.

References

2000 deaths
1929 births
People from Përmet
Albanian people of Greek descent
Labour Party of Albania politicians
Members of the Politburo of the Labour Party of Albania
Candidate members of the Politburo of the Labour Party of Albania
Speakers of the Parliament of Albania
Members of the Parliament of Albania
State auditors of Albania